Dietmar Seyferth (January 11, 1929 – June 6, 2020) was an emeritus professor of chemistry at the Massachusetts Institute of Technology.  He published widely on topics in organometallic chemistry and was the founding editor of the journal Organometallics.

Biography
Seyferth was born in 1929 in Chemnitz, Saxony, Germany, and received his college education at the University of Buffalo. His PhD thesis dealt with main group chemistry under the mentorship of Eugene G. Rochow at Harvard. He also contributed to organocobalt chemistry and organoiron chemistry, e.g. the popularization of Fe2S2(CO)6. He died on Saturday, June 6, 2020, due to complications from COVID-19 during the COVID-19 pandemic in Massachusetts.

Seyferth has been widely recognized, notably with the American Chemical Society Award in Organometallic Chemistry and election to the U.S. National Academy of Sciences.

References

1929 births
2020 deaths
Inorganic chemists
University at Buffalo alumni
Harvard University alumni
Members of the United States National Academy of Sciences
German emigrants to the United States
Deaths from the COVID-19 pandemic in Massachusetts